Joannes Evangelista Benedictus Maria "Jan-Benedict" Steenkamp (born June 12, 1959) is a marketing professor and author. He is the Knox Massey Distinguished Professor of Marketing at Kenan-Flagler Business School, University of North Carolina at Chapel Hill. He is also the co-founder and executive director of AiMark, a global center studying key marketing strategy issues. Steenkamp is the author of Time to Lead, Retail Disruptors, Global Brand Strategy, Brand Breakout and Private Label Strategy. He is one of the most cited scholars in business and marketing.

Early life
Steenkamp was born in Amsterdam, as the third child of Constance Marie Therèse (née Nolet), and Petrus Antonius Josephus Maria (Piet) Steenkamp (March 8, 1925 – January 8, 2016). In 1966, the family moved to Eindhoven where his father became full professor and dean at the Eindhoven University of Technology. His father founded the Christian Democratic Appeal (CDA) which was the senior party in the Dutch government for most of the period 1977–2010 and was the president of the Dutch Senate from 1983 to 1991.

Education and career
Steenkamp received his PhD (marketing), Master of Science (business administration) and Bachelor of Science (economics) degrees (all summa cum laude) from Wageningen University in the Netherlands. In 2010, he was awarded a Doctor Honoris Causa by Aarhus University for his contributions to marketing science.

From 1966 to 1977, Steenkamp attended elementary and secondary school in Eindhoven. From 1977 to 1983, he studied economics (Bachelor's) and business administration (Master's) at Wageningen University, the Netherlands. He wrote two master theses, one on the political risks multinational corporations face when investing in foreign countries, and a second one on the construction of orthogonal designs for conjoint measurement experiments. In 1983, he was appointed lecturer of marketing at Wageningen University, and in 1985, assistant professor. He obtained his PhD degree in 1989. In the 1980s, Dutch universities did not have a formal dissertation trajectory – one was expected to do it on the job, after obtaining a master's degree. His dissertation, Product Quality, was commercially published by Van Gorcum. His dissertation research drew international attention, especially the finding of an almost negligible correlation between a product's price and its real quality.

He worked at Wageningen University from 1989 to 1992. Between 1992 and 2000, he was associate professor and from 1996 onwards full professor at the Catholic University of Leuven, Belgium. At the same time, he was GfK Professor of International Marketing Research at Wageningen University. Between 2000 and 2006, he was CentER Research Professor of Marketing and GfK Professor of International Marketing Research, Tilburg University, Netherlands. In 2006, he joined UNC Kenan-Flagler Business School as C. Knox Massey Distinguished Professor of Marketing and Chairman of the Marketing Area.

Steenkamp is the co-founder and executive director of AiMark, a global center studying key marketing strategy issues, which works closely with two of the world's largest market research agencies, Kantar and GfK. He is a Fellow at the Institute for Sustainable Innovation and Growth (iSIG), Fudan University, Shanghai.

He has consulted with organisations such as Procter & Gamble, Kraft, General Mills, Zurich Insurance Group, KPMG, Unilever, Johnson & Johnson, Sara Lee, Reckitt Benckiser, Bristol-Myers Squibb, Bunge Limited, The Brattle Group, GfK, TNS, IRI, Nutreco, Netherlands Department of Agriculture, King & Spalding, Shook, Hardy & Bacon and Sidley Austin.

Steenkamp's work has been featured in the Wall Street Journal, Financial Times, The Economist, New York Times, Los Angeles Times, The Times of India, Hindustan Times, China Daily, Ad Age, Business Today and Bloomberg Businessweek.

Research and publications
Steenkamp is a leading scholar and widely cited expert on Global Marketing, Branding, Marketing Strategy and Emerging Markets.

He has published his research in the Journal of Marketing, Journal of Marketing Research, Marketing Science, Journal of Consumer Research, Psychometrika, Management Science, Academy of Management Journal, Strategic Management Journal and Harvard Business Review.

Steenkamp's research deals with the various elements of marketing strategy (product, price, promotion, advertising, distribution, segmentation) and marketing research methodology. Collectively, his body of research involves integrating theory drawn from marketing and other social science domains (management, economics, psychology, political science) with cutting edge, rigorous methodology, using large empirical data sets, to address managerially relevant research issues.

Awards and honors
In 2005, Steenkamp was awarded the Dr Hendrik Muller Prize for "exceptional achievements in the area of the behavioral and social sciences" by the Royal Netherlands Academy of Arts and Sciences. This was the first time the prize awarded to a researcher in any area of business administration. He also served on the 2018 Spinoza Prize Committee.

The IJRM-EMAC Steenkamp Award given annually to research papers published in International Journal of Research in Marketing that have made a long term impact on the field of marketing is named in his honor. In 2018, he was awarded the AMA Global Marketing Lifetime award for significant contributions to Global Marketing.

In 2008, Steenkamp was ranked the most influential scholar in marketing in the period 1997–2006.

The Elsevier Society for Marketing Advances named him the 2004 Elsevier Distinguished Marketing Scholar. In 2013 he was given the EMAC Distinguished Marketing Scholar Award in recognition of his impactful research contributions and outstanding contributions to the European Marketing Academy.

In 2015, the American Marketing Association awarded him the Gilbert A. Churchill Award for Lifetime Contributions to Marketing Research. This award recognized Steenkamp as a leading expert on structural equation modeling and cited his contributions on measurement invariance for setting new standards for international marketing research.

Steenkamp has won several awards for his research publications. He won the 2002 John D.C. Little award and the 2003 Frank Bass award from INFORMS for his research work. He was given the Willim F. O’Dell Award for the 1999 article in the Journal of Marketing Research that has made the "most significant long-term contribution to marketing theory, methodology, and/or practice" for the paper International Market Segmentation Based on Consumer-Product Relations.

Books

Selected publications

See also
Global Marketing
Marketing Strategy
Marketing Mix
Consumer Innovativeness
Private Label
 Diaspora Marketing
Measurement invariance
Common-method variance

References

Further reading

External links
Brand Breakout
AiMark
Branding Success in Emerging Market Companies (video) – Bloomberg Television
How Emerging Markets Compete With Developing World (video) – Wall Street Journal
专访美国教授 Jan-Benedict Steenkamp (video) – International Channel Shanghai
Jan-Benedict Steenkamp interviewed by Fudan University’s Peggy Pan (video)
Professor Jan-Benedict Steenkamp Provides A Master Class On Global Branding – CMO.com
Google Scholar Citations
Jan-Benedict E.M. Steenkamp's CV
UNC Kenan-Flagler Marketing Department Page

1959 births
Living people
Dutch economists
21st-century American economists
Marketing people
Marketing theorists
Wageningen University and Research alumni
Academic staff of Wageningen University and Research
Academic staff of KU Leuven
University of North Carolina at Chapel Hill faculty
Dutch expatriates in the United States
Scientists from Amsterdam